In orbital mechanics, Kepler's equation relates various geometric properties of the orbit of a body subject to a central force.

It was derived by Johannes Kepler in 1609 in Chapter 60 of his Astronomia nova, and in book V of his Epitome of Copernican Astronomy (1621) Kepler proposed an iterative solution to the equation. This equation and its solution, however, first appeared in 9th century work of Habash al-Hasib al-Marwazi related to problems of parallax. The equation has played an important role in the history of both physics and mathematics, particularly classical celestial mechanics.

Equation

Kepler's equation is

The 'eccentric anomaly'  is useful to compute the position of a point moving in a Keplerian orbit.

where  is the semi-major axis,  the semi-minor axis.

Kepler's equation is a transcendental equation because sine is a transcendental function, meaning it cannot be solved for  algebraically. Numerical analysis and series expansions are generally required to evaluate .

Alternate forms 

There are several forms of Kepler's equation. Each form is associated with a specific type of orbit. The standard Kepler equation is used for elliptic orbits. The hyperbolic Kepler equation is used for hyperbolic trajectories. The radial Kepler equation is used for linear (radial) trajectories. Barker's equation is used for parabolic trajectories.

When , the orbit is circular. Increasing  causes the circle to become elliptical. When , there are three possibilities:
 a parabolic trajectory,
 a trajectory going in or out along an infinite ray emanating from the centre of attraction,
 or a trajectory that goes back and forth along a line segment from the centre of attraction to a point at some distance away.

Further increases reduce the turning angle, and as  goes to infinity, the orbit becomes a straight line of infinite length.

Hyperbolic Kepler equation

The Hyperbolic Kepler equation is:

where  is the hyperbolic eccentric anomaly.
This equation is derived by redefining M to be the square root of −1 times the right-hand side of the elliptical equation:

Radial Kepler equation
The Radial Kepler equation is:

This equation is derived by multiplying Kepler's equation by 1/2 and setting  to 1:

and then making the substitution

Inverse problem 

However, solving for  when  is given can be considerably more challenging. There is no closed-form solution.

Confusion over the solvability of Kepler's equation has persisted in the literature for four centuries. Kepler himself expressed doubt at the possibility of finding a general solution:

Fourier series expansion (with respect to ) using Bessel functions is 

Inverse Kepler equation

The inverse Kepler equation is the solution of Kepler's equation for all real values of :

 

Evaluating this yields:

 

These series can be reproduced in Mathematica with the InverseSeries operation.
 InverseSeries[Series[M - Sin[M], {M, 0, 10}]]
 InverseSeries[Series[M - e Sin[M], {M, 0, 10}]]

These functions are simple Maclaurin series. Such Taylor series representations of transcendental functions are considered to be definitions of those functions. Therefore, this solution is a formal definition of the inverse Kepler equation. Indeed, the derivative

The series can also be used for the hyperbolic case, in which case the radius of convergence is  The series for when  converges when .

While this solution is the simplest in a certain mathematical sense,, other solutions are preferable for most applications. Alternatively, Kepler's equation can be solved numerically.

Inverse radial Kepler equation

The inverse radial Kepler equation can also be written as:
 

Evaluating this yields:

To obtain this result using Mathematica:
InverseSeries[Series[ArcSin[Sqrt[t]] - Sqrt[(1 - t) t], {t, 0, 15}]]

Numerical approximation of inverse problem

For most applications, the inverse problem can be computed numerically by finding the root of the function:

 

This can be done iteratively via Newton's method:

 

This iteration is repeated until desired accuracy is obtained (e.g. when  < desired accuracy). In that case, the bisection method will provide guaranteed convergence, particularly since the solution can be bounded in a small initial interval. On modern computers, it is possible to achieve 4 or 5 digits of accuracy in 17 to 18 iterations. A similar approach can be used for the hyperbolic form of Kepler's equation. In the case of a parabolic trajectory, Barker's equation is used.

Fixed-point iteration 

A related method starts by noting that . This method is identical to Kepler's 1621 solution.

function E(e, M, n)
    E = M
    for k = 1 to n
        E = M + e*sin E
    next k
    return E

The hyperbolic form similarly has .

This method is related to the Newton's method solution above in that

 

.

See also 
Kepler's laws of planetary motion
Kepler problem
Kepler problem in general relativity
Radial trajectory

References

External links 

 
 
 
 
 
 
 
 
 
 
 
 
 

 Kepler's Equation at Wolfram Mathworld

Johannes Kepler
Orbits